AlphaSphere is an electronic musical instrument that was designed and developed by British company, nu desine. The primary concept of the AlphaSphere is to increase the level of expression available to electronic musicians by allowing for the playing style of a musical instrument. Even before the product had been fully developed it had appeared at many events worldwide including the NAMM Show, Musikmesse, TEDx conferences, and the Future Everything Festival and received press from popular organizations such as Sound on Sound, BBC, Wired and MusicRadar. There are currently two different AlphaSphere models - the nexus series and the elite series.

History
The initial concept of AlphaSphere was conceived while company founder Adam Place was studying at the Nagoya University of Arts in Japan, where he produced an initial prototype.
In September 2010, Adam was commissioned by Media Sandbox, a development funding scheme which is part of Bristol's Watershed subsidiary iShed, to further develop his concept by researching into smart materials. This spawned the birth of nu desine which soon developed into a team that specializes in music technology, electronics engineering, product design, software development and user interface design.

In April 2012, nu desine announced that they had started taking pre-orders for a limited edition elite series AlphaSphere, with the first batch of elite AlphaSphere's being shipped in March 2013. In July 2013, nu desine announced the nexus series, the standard version of the AlphaSphere. This was shortly followed by the instrument being available in musical instrument retail stores in both the United States and Japan, and then in November 2013 it became available to UK and Europe through the AlphaSphere website.

The AlphaSphere is currently being used by several high-profile artists such as Talvin Singh and Enter Shikari.

Features
The nexus series is the standard AlphaSphere model. Characteristics of this model are:
An ergonomic and modular spherical design.
48 tactile, elasticated pads that respond to touch, velocity, and pressure. The pressure sensitivity allows for real-time modulation of audio parameters of each played note/sound individually.
USB connectivity and power which communicates with software via the HID and MIDI protocols.
LEDs that react to touch and pressure input.
As a MIDI instrument the AlphaSphere is fully compatible with polyphonic aftertouch and multichannel MIDI.
Custom software called AlphaLive that can be used as the device's MIDI mapping editor, and also has its own sampler and sequencer capabilities, as well as allowing MIDI messages to be converted to OSC. Both the software and the firmware are open source.
Infinitely programmable. Though there are a number of suggested notational arrangements, there is no set note or function for each pad - note layouts and scales can be set over the pads as desired as well the mode of each pad and the parameters that the pressure modulates. This also lends itself to be useful for alternative notational layouts, such as the Harmonic table and Wicki-Hayden note layouts that are well suited to the Hexagonal lattice pad layout.

Limited Edition Elite Model
The elite series is the high-end AlphaSphere model. It comes with all the features of the AlphaSphere nexus, plus the following extra features:
Hardware MIDI-out port
Two freely assignable dials
Three freely assignable buttons
High-end, soft-touch finish
Available in black

See also 
List of musical instruments#Electronic instruments

References

External links 
 
 Music Radar - Introducing the AlphaSphere
 AlphaSphere on BBC News

MIDI controllers
Software synthesizers